The Youthful Stakes was an American Thoroughbred horse race for two-year-old horses run between 1903 and 1982. It was raced on dirt at three different tracks in the New York City area beginning with the Jamaica and Aqueduct Racetracks, then in 1972 to Belmont Park where it remained until being canceled after the 1982 running. The inaugural edition in 1903 was won by Hazelwood with the race suspended until 1913.  

The Youthful Stakes was established in an era when North American races like the Belmont Futurity Stakes, Tremont Stakes, Remsen Stakes, Arlington-Washington Futurity Stakes, Laurel Futurity Stakes, and Coronation Futurity Stakes for two-year-old horses were often the richest and most prestigious of the year. Among its most notable winners were U.S. Racing Hall of Fame inductees Man O' War, Native Dancer, and Affirmed.

In 1950, the Youthful Stakes was run in two divisions.

Records
Speed record:
 5 furlongs at Aqueduct Racetrack : 0:57.60, Golden Joey (1964)
 5 ½ furlongs at Belmont Park: 1:03.00, Raise A Cup (1973)

Most wins by a jockey:
 4 – Ted Atkinson (1944, 1945, 1948, 1956)
 4 – Eric Guerin (1947, 1952, 1954, 1958)

Most wins by a trainer:
 3 – James G. Rowe Sr. (1916, 1920, 1924)
 3 – Sam Hildreth (1917, 1923, 1927)
 3 – James W. Healy (1936, 1937, 1945)
 3 – Winbert F. Mulholland (1942, 1943, 1950)

Most wins by an owner:
 4 – George D. Widener Jr. (1928, 1942, 1943, 1950)

Winners

* 1930 - Equipose won by was disqualified for twice impeding runner-up Vander Pool.
* 1950 - 1st division - Bank Account finished first but was disqualified to last.

References

Discontinued horse races in New York (state)
Belmont Park
Aqueduct Racetrack
Jamaica Race Course
Flat horse races for two-year-olds
Recurring sporting events established in 1903
Recurring sporting events disestablished in 1982
1903 establishments in New York City
1982 disestablishments in New York (state)